Michael van der Mark (born 26 October 1992) is a motorcycle road racer based in the Netherlands. He competes in the Superbike World Championship with a BMW M1000RR. He was the 2012 European Superstock 600 champion. In 2013 and 2014 he won the Suzuka 8 Hours with Takumi Takahashi and Leon Haslam in the Endurance FIM World Championship on a Honda CBR1000RRW. In 2014 he won the Supersport World Championship with PATA Honda.

In 2015 he moved to the Superbike level continuing with the Pata Honda team. In  he made his debut in the MotoGP class of Grand Prix motorcycle racing at Sepang as a replacement for ill rider Jonas Folger in the Tech 3 satellite Yamaha team. In the same year he won his third Suzuka 8 Hours, this time on a Yamaha YZF-R1 with Alex Lowes and Katsuyuki Nakasuga.

Career statistics

Grand Prix motorcycle racing

By season

Races by year
(key) (Races in bold indicate pole position; races in italics indicate fastest lap)

Supersport World Championship

Races by year
(key) (Races in bold indicate pole position; races in italics indicate fastest lap)

Superbike World Championship

Races by year
(key) (Races in bold indicate pole position; races in italics indicate fastest lap)

Suzuka 8 Hours results

References

External links

 

1992 births
Living people
Dutch people of Moluccan descent
Dutch motorcycle racers
125cc World Championship riders
Moto2 World Championship riders
Supersport World Championship riders
Superbike World Championship riders
Sportspeople from Gouda, South Holland
Tech3 MotoGP riders
MotoGP World Championship riders